"We Bring an Arsenal" is the second single from Weapons, the fifth studio album by Welsh alternative rock band Lostprophets, released 4 June 2012. It was first played live on 25 February 2012 at Brisbane, Australia.

Meaning
Guitarist Mike Lewis said the following to Purple Revolver on 8 May 2012.

Music video
The video for "We Bring an Arsenal" was released on 21 May 2012.
The video features the band leading a group of what looks like a riot through a city, just like guitarist Mike Lewis has described, "us vs. them, underdog mentality". The band members are singing along to the song, while leading through. It is the first to feature skaters since "Rooftops", in 2006. Just like the previous video, "Bring 'Em Down", it does not show the band performing in the video. The video was shot on 3 May 2012, in London. Lostprophets also offered fans to be in the video.

Chart positions

Personnel
 Ian Watkins – lead vocals
 Lee Gaze – lead guitar
 Mike Lewis – rhythm guitar
 Stuart Richardson – bass guitar
 Jamie Oliver – piano, keyboard, samples, vocals
 Luke Johnson – drums, percussion

References

Lostprophets songs
2012 singles
2012 songs
Epic Records singles